Bastrop is a city in Morehouse Parish, Louisiana. It is the parish seat of Morehouse Parish. The population was 11,365 at the 2010 census, a decrease of 1,623 from the 12,988 tabulation of 2000. The population of Bastrop is 73 percent African American. It is the principal city of and is included in the Bastrop, Louisiana Micropolitan Statistical Area, which is included in the Monroe-Bastrop, Louisiana Combined Statistical Area.

History
Bastrop was founded by the Felipe Enrique Neri, Baron de Bastrop, a Dutch businessman accused as an embezzler. He had fled to the then Spanish colony of Louisiana to escape prosecution, and became involved in various land deals. In New Spain, he falsely claimed to be a nobleman. He received a large grant of land, provided that he could settle 450 families on it over the next several years. However, he was unable to do this, and so lost the grant. Afterwards, he moved to Texas, where he claimed to oppose the sale of Louisiana to the United States and became a minor government official. He proved instrumental in Moses Austin's plan (and later, that of his son, Stephen F. Austin) to bring American colonists to what was then northern Mexico.

Bastrop formally incorporated in 1857, and is the commercial and industrial center of Morehouse Parish. In the 19th century, it was notable as the western edge of the great north Louisiana swamp, but more favorable terrain resulted in the antebellum rail line connecting to Monroe, Louisiana, further to the south.

Bastrop was a Confederate stronghold during the American Civil War until January 1865, when 3,000 cavalrymen led by Colonel Embury D. Osband of the 3rd United States Colored Cavalry Regiment, embarked from Memphis, Tennessee, for northeastern Louisiana.

During the Great Mississippi Flood of 1927, Bastrop was the site of a relief camp for refugees. During World War II, it was the site of a German prisoner-of-war camp.

Bastrop is also the parish seat of Morehouse Parish and is within an area marketed to tourists as the Sportsman's Paradise Region of Louisiana. It is a Main Street Community and has received Transportation Enhancement funding for improvements in its historic district.

Celebrations and concerts are held in the historic downtown at the restored 1914 Morehouse Parish Courthouse and Rose Theater. Bastrop is home to the Snyder Museum and Creative Arts Center, housed in the circa 1929 home of a local family. Volunteers lead heritage appreciation tours for children and interpret the history of the parish using local artifacts.

Economics
The Bastrop area economy is largely based on forestry, cotton and rice farming, and potato shipping. Hunting, camping, and fishing are pastimes in the many bayous and rivers. Shopping is also a popular tourist attraction in the area. The Snyder Museum keeps information relating to local history and displays furniture typical of fine homes from the Civil War and early 20th century periods.

Barham's Drugs on the courthouse square in Bastrop was formerly owned and operated by Henry Alfred Barham, Jr. (1919-1993), and his wife, the former Ann Jocelyn Heres (1929-2015). Mrs. Barham, originally educated in home economics at Louisiana State University in Baton Rouge, was the first woman pharmacist in Morehouse Parish and a graduate of the pharmacy school at the University of Louisiana at Monroe. She was a two-term member of the Morehouse Parish School Board. Alfred Barham was an older brother of Mack Barham, a justice of the Louisiana Supreme Court, and a distant cousin of State Senators Robert J. Barham and Edwards Barham.

IPC mill closing

On November 21, 2008, International Paper Company, the largest area employer, announced the cessation of operations of its Bastrop mill. The company first said that the closure is "indefinite" and subsequently confirmed that the exodus is "permanent".

Poultry plant shutdowns affect Bastrop
In 2009, poultry processor Pilgrim's Pride announced that it was closing multiple facilities in Arcadia, Athens, Choudrant and Farmerville, a decision that impacted the economy of Bastrop. In response, Governor Bobby Jindal and the state legislature, moved to subsidize with $50 million from the state's megafund to a new poultry plant owner, Foster Farms of California. Subsequently, DG Foods based in Hazlehurst, Mississippi, opened a poultry processing plant at Bastrop to serve the poultry industry in June 2011. The company currently employs around 380 workers and serve customers with custom processing of products and sized portions for retail sales and restaurants. The poultry industry continues to be an important employer for low to medium skilled workers.

Drax Biomass
On December 17, 2012, Governor Jindal and Drax Biomass International Inc. CEO Chuck Davis traveled to Morehouse Parish, Louisiana to announce plans to build a wood pellet facility in Bastrop and a storage-and-shipping facility at the Port of Greater Baton Rouge. The project was completed and the plant was commissioned in 2015 adding 79 new direct jobs, with 64 of the jobs located at the Bastrop wood pellet facility. LED estimates the project generated an additional 150 indirect jobs in the state. Drax' budget for the Morehouse mill was about $120 million. Drax says the average pay plus benefits averages more than $35,000 annually at the pellet mill. Drax is shipping wood pellets formed in Morehouse Parish to its U.K. Energy facilities for use in generating renewable power. July, 2013, Drax Biomass started work on clearing the area for the new wood-based pellet facility in Bastrop.

Geography
Bastrop is located at  (32.777855, −91.914944). It is situated at the crossroads of U.S. Highway 425 and U.S. Highway 165. La. Highway 2 and Louisiana Highway 139 also runs through the town.

Demographics

2020 census

As of the 2020 United States Census, there were 9,691 people, 3,834 households, and 2,273 families residing in the city.

2010 census
As of the 2010 United States Census, there were 11,365 people living in the city. The racial makeup of the city was 72.2% Black, 25.6% White, 0.1% Native American, 0.4% Asian, <0.1% Pacific Islander, <0.1% from some other race and 0.9% from two or more races. 0.8% were Hispanic or Latino of any race.

2000 census
As of the census of 2000, there were 12,988 people, 4,723 households, and 3,301 families living in the city. The racial makeup of the city was 34.67% White, 64.50% African American, 0.13% Native American, 0.15% Asian, 0.04% from other races, and 0.51% from two or more races. Hispanic or Latino of any race were 0.69% of the population.

There were 4,723 households, out of which 33.1% had children under the age of 18 living with them, 37.0% were married couples living together, 28.6% had a female householder with no husband present, and 30.1% were non-families. 27.2% of all households were made up of individuals, and 12.5% had someone living alone who was 65 years of age or older. The average household size was 2.66 and the average family size was 3.25.

In the city, the population was spread out, with 30.1% under the age of 18, 10.1% from 18 to 24, 25.6% from 25 to 44, 18.8% from 45 to 64, and 15.5% who were 65 years of age or older. The median age was 33 years. For every 100 females, there were 82.9 males. For every 100 females age 18 and over, there were 75.3 males.

The median income for a household in the city was $20,418, and the median income for a family was $26,250. Males had a median income of $30,477 versus $15,813 for females. The per capita income for the city was $10,769. About 29.6% of families and 35.3% of the population were below the poverty line, including 46.2% of those under age 18 and 30.5% of those age 65 or over.

National Guard
The 1023rd Engineer Company (Vertical) of the 528th Engineer Battalion of the 225th Engineer Brigade is located in Bastrop.

Government
Bastrop is governed by a mayor and board of aldermen.

In 2013, Arthur Jones, the former long-term Bastrop municipal recreation director, narrowly unseated Alford-Olive. In his first days on the job in July, he spent much of his time reopening the large East Madison swimming pool. The facility has a capacity of 450,000 gallons of water and can accommodate three hundred persons. Jones said that his interest in the pool is a reflection of his concern about idle youth. Jones will seek to attract new smaller industries to Bastrop to fill part of the void left by the closing in 2008 of the International Paper mill.

On April 29, 2017, Henry Cotton defeated former Mayor Betty Alford-Olive in a runoff election to become Mayor-elect. Cotton received 1,758 votes (58%) while Alford-Olive only obtained 741 votes (42%). On June 17, 2021, Betty Alford-Olive was inaugurated as mayor of Bastrop, Louisiana.

The Bastrop City Hall and Police Station were designed by native son Hugh G. Parker (1934–2007), who overcame childhood polio to become a significant architect in Louisiana. The original City Hall dates to 1927 under the Mayor A. G. Bride.

Media

Bastrop and Morehouse Parish are served by a daily newspaper, the Bastrop Daily Enterprise.

Education

School district
The Morehouse Parish School Board operates all public schools within the City of Bastrop and Morehouse Parish.

Elementary schools
 Beekman Charter School 
 Delta Elementary
 Morehouse Magnet School 
Morehouse Elementary

Middle schools
 Beekman Charter Junior High School
 Delta Junior High School
 Morehouse Magnet

High schools
 Bastrop High School
 Beekman Charter High School
 Morehouse Magnet High School

Alternative schools

 Bastrop Learning Academy - an Alternative School for students that prepares them for Career and Workforce Training

Private schools

 Prairie View Academy - the only Private School in Bastrop and Morehouse Parish serving grades PreK 3 through 12th Prairie View Academy

Public libraries

The City of Bastrop is home to two public libraries.
The Main Branch which is Morehouse Parish Library and Dunbar Library. Morehouse Parish Public Library System

Postsecondary schools
Louisiana Delta Community College (Bastrop Campus & Bastrop Airport Campus) 
The City of Bastrop offers its citizens and parish with two campuses of its Region Community and Technical College System. The Main Branch is on Kammell St.(ClOSED)and the other branch is on Airport Rd. adjacent to the City's and Parish Main Airport which is the Morehouse Memorial Airport.

Bastrop High School prayer controversy
In 2011, graduating senior Damon Fowler objected to prayer at the Bastrop High School graduation exercises, claiming a looming violation of the First Amendment to the Constitution of the United States. The American Civil Liberties Union of Louisiana asked the school not to include a prayer in the May 20 graduation. At the Thursday night rehearsal for the graduation, senior Sarah Barlow included a prayer that explicitly mentioned Jesus Christ, and during the graduation, student Laci Mattice led people in the Lord's Prayer before a moment of silence. The school says that Mattice was told not to include a prayer. Fowler stated that after his objections became public he was ostracized by other students.

Gallery

Neighborhoods

 Park Place
 White Star
 Gladney Park Estates
 Morehouse Country Club Estates
 Morehouse Country Club Extension Estates
 Ralph George Park Estates
 Downtown
 Austin Village
 Naff Estates
 South Point
 Hill View
 Twin Peaks
 Emily Clark Park Estates
 Briarwood Estates
 Everglade Estates
 Arrowhead Estates
 Arlington Estates
 Airport Estates
 Cleveland Estates
 Space Estates
 Cooperlake Estates
 Marlett Estates
 Uptown Estates
 United Estates
 Rusty Acres Estates
 Madison Place
 E-Lane
 Cherry Ridge

Suburbs

 Wardville
 Uscarco
 Shelton
 Rogers
 Point Pleasant
 Perryville
 Newhlock
 Log Cabin
 Collinston
 Gum Ridge
 Marcarco
 Spyker
 Upland
 Windsor
 Oak Ridge
 Bordenax
 Mer Rouge
 Galion
 Stampley
 Bonita
 Haynes Landing
 Jones
 Laark
 McGinty
 New Land Grove Landing
 Oak Landing
 Beekman
 Vaughn
 Stevenson
 Robinson
 Naff
 Humphreys
 Geddie
 Couters Neck

Notable people
   
 Ronnie Coleman, professional bodybuilder
 Bill Dickey, Major League Baseball  Hall of Fame catcher for the New York Yankees.
 Denzel Devall, college football player
Michael Echols, member of the Louisiana House of Representatives 
 Stump Edington, Major League Baseball player who died in Bastrop
 David 'Bo' Ginn, state senator from Morehouse Parish from 1980 to 1988
 Luther E. Hall, Governor of Louisiana
 Stacey Hawkins,  United States Air Force major general.
 Ed Head, Major League Baseball player who died in Bastrop.
 Mable John, Motown Records singer, was born in Bastrop.
 Bob Love, NBA Basketball Player
 Jim Looney, NFL player
 Calvin Natt, National Basketball Association player who was born in Monroe, but attended Bastrop High School, later NLU and was an NBA All-Star with the Denver Nuggets.
 Kenny Natt, National Basketball Association younger brother of Kenny Natt, Drafted by Indiana Pacers in 1980
 Willie Parker, NFL and WFL player
 Rueben Randle, LSU Tigers football, Wide Receiver, and led Bastrop High School to a State Championship, was drafted by the New York Giants in the 2012 draft
 Shane Reynolds, Major League Baseball player
 John Wesley Ryles, Country singer was born in Bastrop in 1950.
 Talance Sawyer, was also born in Bastrop and later played for the Minnesota Vikings.
 Dylan Scott, country music singer-songwriter
 Pat Williams, NFL player who was born in Bastrop and played for the Minnesota Vikings.
 Hulon B. Whittington, Medal of Honor recipient

References

External links

City of Bastrop
Bastrop Progress Community Progress Site for Bastrop, LA
Bastrop Daily Enterprise
(http://www.mpsb.us)

Cities in Louisiana
B
Cities in Morehouse Parish, Louisiana
1857 establishments in Louisiana